Nicolas-Joseph Billot de La Ferrière, stage-name Florence (4 March 1749, Léry - 25 June 1816, rue Traversière, Paris) was a French actor.

He began his career in 1771 at the Théâtre de la Monnaie in Brussels, and moved to Versailles in 1777 in Mme Montansier's company. Also in 1777 he made his anonymous début at the Comédie-Française, but was only received into its company after a second on 7 May 1778.  He was admitted as a sociétaire in April 1779, and devoted the next 25 years to the Comédie-Française's interests, making them forget his lack of talent.  Imprisoned with several other actors during the Reign of Terror, he owed his safe release to La Bussière.  He retired in 1804 and died in 1816.

1749 births
1816 deaths
Sociétaires of the Comédie-Française
French male stage actors
18th-century French male actors
19th-century French male actors